Kadapiku is a village in Tapa Parish, Lääne-Viru County, in northearn Estonia. It lies on the Valgejõgi River.

References

Villages in Lääne-Viru County